Bangladeshis in Japan form one of the smaller populations of foreigners in Japan. As of in June 2022, Japan's Ministry of Justice recorded 20,954 Bangladeshi nationals among the total population of registered foreigners in Japan.

Migration history

Bangladeshi labour migration to Japan, in common with that to other economically developed parts of East Asia, namely South Korea and Taiwan, is believed to have begun around 1985. Prospective workers would obtain student visas to enter into language schools, which would allow them to work legally up to 20 hours per week to support themselves; they used their period of study to put down roots in Japan and find more permanent full-time work. Such migration reached a peak in 1988, but dropped off sharply in 1989 as Japanese authorities tightened the requirements for obtaining student visas. In the late 1980s and early 1990s, deportations jumped sharply, with nearly five thousand in 1990 alone; however, both new arrivals and previous deportees turned to people smugglers to re-enter the country. A 2007 survey estimated that a quarter of illegal migrants from Bangladesh arrived after April 1989. Even after the bursting of the Japanese asset price bubble, their wages remained relatively high, typically exceeding 150% of the minimum wage; Bangladeshi migrants prefer Japan to Saudi Arabia or the United Arab Emirates and consider it a more "prestigious destination" due to the higher wages which continue to be offered.

Demographic characteristics
Bangladeshi migrants in Japan tend to come from a middle-class background. While fewer than four percent of Bangladeshis overall had higher educational background, nearly 30% of Bangladeshis in Japan had graduated from secondary schools. This meant that they were more educated not only than their peers in their home country, but other groups of migrant workers in Japan. Over 80% of migrants are estimated to come from Munshiganj District, south of Dhaka; they are also quite young, with some having come directly after university graduation and lacking any further employment experience. They are spurred to leave Bangladesh due to high unemployment and low salaries; however, upon arriving in Japan, they find themselves limited to so-called "3D" ("Dirty, Dangerous and Demeaning") jobs beneath their qualifications, though at much higher salaries than they could have earned at home. Men outnumber women by a ratio of nearly four-to-one.

Bangladeshi migrants remain in Japan for an average of nearly seven years before returning home, each remitting US$59,068 ($739/month). They enjoy some social mobility due to the money they saved while abroad; one survey, which focused on Dhaka residents returned from Japan, found that over 50% used their funds to start their own businesses upon their return, rather than attempting to remigrate to Japan or other destinations and continue at menial jobs. Housing was not a popular use of funds saved, though 50% of migrants who remained in Japan for longer than five years purchased land in Bangladesh.

Notable individuals

 Monzurul Huq, writer, journalist and academician
 Kazi Ghiyasuddin, artist 
 Islam Mohamed Himu, businessman
 Firoz Mahmud, contemporary visual artist
 Rola (born 1990), fashion model and celebrity
 Ashir Ahemed, associate professor at Kyushu University
 Md Ahmedul Azam, Researcher, Journalist
 Sumaya Matsushima, Bangladeshi footballer

References

Further reading
 

Japan, Bangladeshis in
 
Ethnic groups in Japan
 
Bangladesh–Japan relations